Tonbridge was a twin-screw cargo ship that was built in 1924 by D. and W. Henderson and Co. Ltd., Glasgow for the Southern Railway. She was requisitioned by the Admiralty in 1940 and converted to a netlayer. She was in service until bombed and sunk by a German aircraft on 22 August 1941.

Description
The engines were built by Henderson. They were rated at 166 NHP each.

History

Southern Railway
Tonbridge was built in 1924 as yard number 633 by D. and W. Henderson and Co. Ltd., Glasgow for the Southern Railway. She was launched on 3 June 1924 and completed on 21 July 1924. Her port of registry was London. The Code Letters KRDL and United Kingdom Official Number 147690 were allocated. With the change of Code Letters in 1934, Tonbridge was allocated the letters MLYV.

Royal Navy
In October 1940, Tonbridge was requisitioned by the Admiralty. She was converted to a netlayer for the Royal Navy. She served as HMS Tonbridge with the pennant number  T119. On 22 August 1941, HMS Tonbridge was bombed and sunk in the  North Sea off Great Yarmouth, Norfolk by German aircraft. She was lost 3 cables off the Scroby Elbow Buoy with the loss of 35 of her crew.

External links
Photograph of Tonbridge.

References

1924 ships
Ships built on the River Clyde
Merchant ships of the United Kingdom
Steamships of the United Kingdom
Ships of the Southern Railway (UK)
World War II merchant ships of the United Kingdom
World War II auxiliary ships of the United Kingdom
Maritime incidents in August 1941
Ships sunk by German aircraft